Nargis is a 1946 Hindi language film directed by D.D. Kashyap, starring David Abraham, Nargis, Rehman.

Cast 
 David Abraham
 Nargis
 Rehman

Music 
Aa Ankho Me Aa Palko Me - Amirbai Karnataki
Mai Kaise Kahu Tumse Jana - Amirbai Karnataki
Roti Ankho Me Teri Yaad Liye Jati Hu - Amirbai Karnataki
Ye To Bata Mere Khuda - N/A
Kya Bataye Ki Mohabbat Ki Kahani Kya Hai - Zohrabai Ambalewali
Mere Jivan Ke Sahare So Ja - N/A
Mile Sahara Koi Re - Amirbai Karnataki

External links 
 

1940s Hindi-language films
Films scored by Husnlal Bhagatram
Indian black-and-white films